is a train station on the Kintetsu Osaka Line in Hagiwara, Haibara, Uda, Nara Prefecture, Japan, representing the city of Uda.

Layout
Haibara Station has one side platform and two island platforms serving 5 tracks under the station building.

Platforms

Adjacent stations

Railway stations in Japan opened in 1930
Railway stations in Nara Prefecture
Uda, Nara